Sinforosa Eyang Nguema Nchama (born 26 April 1994), also known as Mirey and La Mirey de Fifi, is an Equatoguinean singer and football manager and former player who coaches Huracanes FC in the Equatoguinean women's league.

Eyang was a midfielder during her playing career, which included to be a vice-captain of the Equatorial Guinea women's national team, with which she played the 2011 FIFA Women's World Cup. On club level she played for Estrellas de E'Waiso Ipola and Super Leonas (which she captained) in her country.

International goals
Scores and results list Equatorial Guinea's goal tally first

References

External links
 

1994 births
Living people
Place of birth missing (living people)
Equatoguinean singers
African women singers
Equatoguinean women's footballers
Women's association football midfielders
Equatorial Guinea women's international footballers
Footballers at the 2010 Summer Youth Olympics
2011 FIFA Women's World Cup players
Equatoguinean football managers
Female association football managers
Women's association football managers